Harold Johann Thomas Ellingham, OBE, (1897–1975) was a British physical chemist, best known for his Ellingham diagrams, which summarize a large amount of information concerning extractive metallurgy.

Ellingham studied at the Royal College of Science from 1914 to 1916. He became a demonstrator at the college in 1919 and reader in physical chemistry in 1937. He was secretary of the Royal College of Science 1940–44 and of the Royal Institute of Chemistry 1944–63. He was made a fellow of Imperial College in 1949 and an Officer of the Order of the British Empire (OBE) in 1962.

Ellingham is best known for his diagrams plotting the Gibbs energy change for the reaction
 M + O2  
against temperature. By normalizing the thermodynamic functions to the reaction with one mole of oxygen, Ellingham was able to compare the temperature stability of many different oxides on the same diagram. In particular, he could show graphically that carbon becomes a stronger reducing agent as the temperature increases. The reduction of metal oxides with carbon (or carbon monoxide) to form the free metals is of immense industrial importance (e.g., the manufacture of iron in a blast furnace), and Ellingham diagrams show the lowest temperature at which the reaction will occur for each metal.

Notes and references

Notes

References

British chemists
1897 births
1975 deaths
Alumni of the Royal College of Science
Academics of Imperial College London